Lethe  dakwania is a species of Satyrinae butterfly found in the  Indomalayan realm ( North India, Kashmir).

References

dakwania
Butterflies of Asia